Route 391 is a provincial highway located in the Abitibi-Témiscamingue region in southwestern Quebec near the Ontario border. The  road runs from the junction of Route 101 near St-Édouard-de-Fabre and ends in Rouyn-Noranda at the junction of Route 117. Between Lorrainville and Laverlochère-Angliers, it overlaps Route 382. Near Rollet, it is also concurrent with Route 101.

Towns along Route 391

 Saint-Édouard-de-Fabre
 Béarn
 Lorrainville
 Laverlochère-Angliers
 Saint-Eugène-de-Guigues
 Guérin
 Rémigny
 Rouyn-Noranda

See also
 List of Quebec provincial highways

References

External links  
  Official Transports Quebec Map 
 Route 391 on Google Maps

391
Roads in Abitibi-Témiscamingue
Transport in Rouyn-Noranda